Tobergill is a townland of 1,044 acres in County Antrim, Northern Ireland. Lying on the western aspect of 
Donegore hill, it is situated in the civil parish of Donegore and the historic barony of Antrim Upper.

The name Tobergill is variously recorded as Tubbergeill in 1608, Turbergeile in 1621 and Tubbergill in 1669.

Archaeology
There is a stone circle in Tobergall at grid ref: J208905. Only one large stone remains standing, others lie scattered around.

A souterrain with three chambers was investigated by archaeologists in 1959-60 after being uncovered by two farmers ploughing a field. It was later filled in and covered again, for the safety of livestock.

See also 
List of townlands in County Antrim
List of places in County Antrim

References

 

Townlands of County Antrim
Civil parish of Donegore
Archaeological sites in County Antrim